Maryam Hooleh (born 1978) is an Iranian writer and poet.

Early life
Maryam Hooleh is an Iranian Kurd currently living in Sweden. She was born in Tehran. She began to write at an early age. At the age of seventeen, Hooleh traveled from Iran to Greece, illegally and on foot. It took 23 days to make the trip to Athens. She stayed one year and then returned to Iran. Mansoureh Saboori, an American director and filmmaker, made a documentary about her life, her poems and her trip to Greece called Another Birth. (“Another birth” is also the name of a book written by Iranian poet Forugh Farrokhzad.)

Hooleh's poetry deals with topics concerning the Islamic regime and hutouchede. It has touched on themes about the female body and repression under the Iran regime. Her works tend to question religious and cultural taboos and criticize the human condition in the postmodern world. Her poetry is usually labeled as postmodernist.

Work
Hooleh's first book, The kite will never fly in my hands, was published in 1998 by Midland Graphic publishing in Chicago. Her second book, In the Alleys of Athens, was published in 1999 by the Mir-Kasra publishing house in Tehran.

In 2000, Hooleh was invited by The Iranian Women Studies Foundation to Sweden where her third book, Cursed Booth, was published by Baran publications. In 2003 she won a literary scholarship from Swedish PEN and moved to Sweden. Her fourth and fifth books, Contemporaneous leprosy and Hell INC, were published by Arzan publications in 2004 and her sixth book, The Sticky Dreams of a Banished Butterfly, was published over the net as an E-book and Audio Book. Her poetry has also been among the most selected works for translation in anthologies.

Hooleh's poems have been translated to English, Swedish, French, Kurdish, Turkish and some other languages, and she was one of the poets invited to the Struga Poetry Evenings in 2014.

Bibliography

The kite will never fly in my hands - Midland Graphic publishing- Chicago 1998.
In Athens streets - Mir Kasra publishing- Tehran 2000- first edition.
Cursed Booth - Baran publishing- Stockholm 2000.
Contemporaneous Leprosy - Arzan publishing- Stockholm 2004 first edition.
Inferno Inc - Arzan publishing/ Stockholm 2004 first edition.
The Sticky Dreams of a Banished Butterfly - Davat publishing and Maniha publishing- 2006.
Contemporaneous Leprosy - Maniha publishing- Stockholm 2015- second edition.
Inferno Inc - Maniha publishing- Stockholm 2015- second edition.
Collusion In This Secret - Maniha publishing- Stockholm 2015.

References

External links
Maryam Hooleh
Absolute nothingness

1978 births
Living people
20th-century Iranian poets
Iranian women writers
People from Tehran
21st-century Iranian poets